Firas al-Sawwah (born 1941) is a Syrian writer

Born in Homs, Syria, in 1941, he currently works with Beijing Foreign Studies University, BFSU, teaching Arab Civilisation and the history of religions in the Near East. Between 2013 and 2016, he published 26 books on mythology, history, and history of religions.

Works

On mythology and history of religions

1 -	Mughamarat al-Aql al-Ula [Mind's First Adventure] – a study on the myths of Syria and Mesopotamia.

2 -	Lugz Ashtar [The Mystery of Ishtar] – Feminine divinity and the origin of religion and myth.

3 -	Gilgamesh – the immortal Mesopotamian epic. 

4 -	Din al-Insan [Humanity's Religion] – a research on religion's essence and religious motives.

5 -	Al-Usturah wal Ma’na [The Myth and Its Meaning] – theories on mythology and Near Eastern religions.

6 -	Tao Te Ching – Text and Commentary. 

7 -	Al-Rahman wal Shaytan [The Merciful and Satan] – the cosmic duality and history's divinity in the Near Eastern religions.

8 -	Al-Wajh al-Akhar lil Masih [Christ's Other Face] – An introduction to Christian Gnosticism.

9 -	Madkhal ila Nusous al-Sharq al-Qadim [An Introduction to the texts of the ancient Near East].

10 -	Tariq Ikhwan al-Safa [The Path of the Brethren of Purity] – An introduction to Islam's Gnosticism.

11 -	Al-Injil Bi Riwayat al-Koran [The Gospels in the Koranic Narrative].

12 -	Alghaz al-Injil [The Gospel's Riddles].

13 -	 Allah, al-Kawn, al-Insan [God, the Universe, and Man].

Encyclopaedia of Religions which was published in five volumes [contribution, compilation, and editing]  

14 -	Primitive societies and the Stone Age.

15 -	The Ancient Near East.

16 -	Greece, Rome, and Europe before Christianity.

17 -	The Far East.

18 -	Zoroastrianism, Manichaeanism, Christianity and Judaism.

On the history of Israel and Biblical studies 

19 -	Al-Hadath al-Tawrati wal Sharq al-Adna al-Qadim [The Torah Narratives and the Ancient Near East].

20 -	Aram Dimashq wa Israel [Aramaic Damascus and Israel] – a study of the historical events in the Bible.

21 -	Tarikh Orshalim wal Bahth An Mamlakat al-Yahud [A History of Jerusalem- In Search of the Jewish Kingdom].

On comparative theology and Koranic researches 
22 -	The Stories in the Koran and their Biblical Parallels.

23 -	The Gospel According to Quran

Memberships 

Member of the Syrian Writers' Association
Member of the General Association of Arab Writers and Authors

Recognition 
He was recognized for his efforts in the fields of history and theology by:
The Syrian Historic Association
The Syrian Communist Party
The Syrian Social Nationalist Party
Amman Municipality in Collaboration with the Jordanian Ministry of Culture

References

1941 births
Living people
Syrian writers